Richard Gaylore Stearns (born June 27, 1944) is a United States district judge of the United States District Court for the District of Massachusetts.

Early life
Born in Los Angeles, California, Stearns received a Bachelor of Arts degree from Stanford University in 1968, a Master of Letters degree (Political Philosophy) from Balliol College, Oxford as a Rhodes Scholar, in 1971, and a Juris Doctor from Harvard Law School in 1976.

Career
Stearns worked on the George McGovern presidential campaign, 1972, and later became a special assistant to McGovern from 1972 to 1973. He was a speech writer in the office of the Lieutenant Governor of Massachusetts from 1975 to 1976. He worked in the Norfolk County (Massachusetts) District Attorney's office from 1976 to 1982. He was an Assistant United States Attorney of the District of Massachusetts from 1982 to 1990. He was an Associate Justice of the Superior Court of Massachusetts from 1990 to 1993.

Federal judicial service

On October 27, 1993, Stearns was nominated by President Bill Clinton to a seat on the United States District Court for the District of Massachusetts vacated by John Joseph McNaught. Stearns was confirmed by the United States Senate on November 20, 1993, and he received his commission on November 24, 1993. Clinton had originally wanted to appoint Stearns Director of the Federal Bureau of Investigation.

References

Sources

1944 births
Living people
Alumni of Balliol College, Oxford
Assistant United States Attorneys
American Rhodes Scholars
Harvard Law School alumni
Judges of the United States District Court for the District of Massachusetts
Massachusetts Superior Court justices
People from Los Angeles
Stanford University alumni
United States district court judges appointed by Bill Clinton
20th-century American judges
21st-century American judges